The 838th Air Expeditionary Advisory Group (838 AEAG) was the ISAF host unit at Shindand Air Base that as part of NATO Air Training Command - Afghanistan was training and advising the Afghan Air Force Shindand Air Wing.  It was a group of the United States Air Force under the 438th Air Expeditionary Wing headquartered at Kabul.

Advisors from the group have conducted humanitarian missions around Shindand Air Base.

In mid 2011 the group received equipment (tents, environmental control units, latrine systems, shower systems, generators and electrical equipment) from FOB Delaram II to create a new camp for approximately 300 additional incoming personnel being deployed to Shindand.

Units 
 Italian Airbase Support Air Advisory Team (civil engineering, computers, basic networking, POL, fire fighting, medical, personnel, intelligence)
 801st Air Expeditionary Advisory Squadron (helicopters)
 802d Air Expeditionary Advisory Squadron (training trainers and maintainers)
 803rd Air Expeditionary Advisory Squadron (fixed-wing; was 444th Air Expeditionary Advisory Squadron)
 445th Air Expeditionary Advisory Squadron (communications; transferred to 47th Garrison Command)
 Expeditionary Security Forces Squadron (ESFS) (base defense function transferred to 47th Garrison Command, September 2012)
 Detachment 1 at Herat

Commanders 
 Army Colonel Michael Senters, unknown - 13 July 2010
 Colonel Larry Bowers, 14 July 2010 - 15 July 2011
 Colonel John Hokaj, 16 July 2011 - 30 June 2012
 Colonel David Gossett, 1 July 2012 - 1 July 2013
 Colonel Daniel T. Lasica, 29 August 2013 - unknown

Awards 
Air Force Meritorious Unit Award 
 1 May 2011 - 30 April 2012
 1 May 2012 - 30 April 2013
 1 October 2013 - 30 September 2014
 1 October 2014 - 6 February 2015

References

External links 
 Current Facebook page, Previous Facebook page
 838th Air Expeditionary Advisory Group at Defense Video & Imagery Distribution System (DVIDS)

Air expeditionary groups of the United States Air Force